Peter's Denial or the denial of Peter is a biblical episode in which Apostle Peter disowns Jesus.

Peter's Denial may also refer to:
 The Denial of Saint Peter (Caravaggio), a painting
 "Peter's Denial" (song), a song from Jesus Christ Superstar